Michael Vento (born May 25, 1978) is a former Major League Baseball outfielder.

Career 
Vento was represented by sports agent Barry Migliorini and Advantage Link during his first MLB contract negotiations with the New York Yankees.

References

External links

1978 births
American expatriate baseball players in Taiwan
Baseball players from New Mexico
New York Yankees players
Washington Nationals players
Major League Baseball right fielders
NMJC Thunderbirds baseball players
Living people
Trenton Thunder players
Camden Riversharks players